Ramachandra Vitthal Lad (1824–1874), commonly known as Bhau Daji Lad  was an Indian physician, Sanskrit scholar, and an antiquarian.

Early life and education
Lad was born in 1822 in a Gaud Saraswat Brahmin family in Mandrem (Manjari) Goa. An Englishman, noticing his acumen at chess convinced his father to give the boy an English education.

Bhau moved to Mumbai and completed his schooling at the Elphinstone Institution. Around this time he won a prize for writing an essay on infanticide, and was appointed a teacher in the Elphinstone Institution. He then studied medicine at the Grant Medical College. He belonged to the class of 1850, the first graduating batch of the college.

Medical career
In 1851, he started practising medicine in Mumbai and became very successful. He studied the Sanskrit literature of medicine. He also tested the value of drugs to which the ancient Hindus had ascribed marvellous powers, among other pathological subjects of historical interest investigating that of leprosy.

Educationist
Being an ardent promoter of education, he was appointed a member of the board of education in Mumbai. He was one of the original fellows of the University of Bombay. He was the first president of native origin, of the Students' Literary and Scientific Society. He was the champion of the cause of female education. A girls' school was founded in his name, for which an endowment was provided by his friends and admirers.

Political career
He took great and active interest in the political developments happening in India. The Bombay Association and the Bombay branch of the East Indian Association owe their existence to his ability and exertions. In honour of Dr. Bhau Daji, a road is named after him at King's Circle in Matunga, Mumbai.  He was twice chosen Sheriff of Mumbai, once in 1869 and again in 1871.

Research
Various scientific societies in England, France, Germany and the United States conferred their membership on him. He contributed numerous papers to the journal of the Bombay branch of the Royal Asiatic Society.

Hobbies

He amassed a large collection of rare ancient Indian coins. He studied Indian antiquities, deciphering inscriptions and ascertaining the dates and history of ancient Sanskrit authors. He died in May 1874.

The Mumbai Victoria & Albert Museum was renamed after him in 1975, and stands testimony to his contribution to the field of arts and heritage.

See also 
 Grant Medical College and Sir Jamshedjee Jeejebhoy Group of Hospitals

References

1822 births
1874 deaths
People from North Goa district
Elphinstone College alumni
19th-century Indian educational theorists
Sheriffs of Mumbai
Marathi people
19th-century antiquarians
19th-century Indian medical doctors
Scholars from Goa
Medical doctors from Goa